Lisle Community Unit School District 202 (Lisle CUSD 202) is a school district headquartered in Lisle, Illinois.

Schools
 Lisle High School
 Lisle Junior High School
 Lisle Elementary School

References

External links
 
 Lisle Junior High School Website 
 Lisle High School Website

Lisle, Illinois
School districts in DuPage County, Illinois